British Council Bangladesh is the Bangladeshi branch of the British Council that provides English and British Education and takes part in cultural exchanges. The main office is located in Dhaka and branches are located in Chittagong, Sylhet. Tom Miscioscia is the Director of British Council Bangladesh.

History
The British Council was founded in 1934 in London. It opened its first branch in Dhaka in 1951 when Bangladesh was a part of Pakistan. On 25 March 1971, at the start of Bangladesh Liberation War, the council office was attacked by Pakistan army, killing 8 East Pakistan Police officers guarding the office. In 2013, the British Council signed a memorandum of understanding with Microsoft Bangladesh to enhance teaching and learning practices. On 16 January 2016, the British Council launched 'Innovate, Incubate and Grow (IIG): A Social Enterprise Support Programme' in collaboration with non-profit organisation Change Maker to promote entrepreneurship.

Following the July 2016 Dhaka attack, the British Council temporarily closed its offices to assess security measurements. In 2017 the council built a monument to the police officers killed on the premises in 1971.

Functions
 The British Council holds O-level and A-level examinations in Bangladesh.
 Facilitating Educational links between the United Kingdom and Bangladesh.
 The British council holds IELTS examinations in Bangladesh, with 15 to 20 thousand students sitting in the examinations every year. The British Council provides the British Council IELTS Scholarships as of 2016.
 Increase and the improve the cultural ties between the United Kingdom and Bangladesh.

Facilities
 British Council Library has 15,000 books and has access to 80,000 eBooks and 14,000 journals.

References

Educational organisations based in Bangladesh
1951 establishments in East Pakistan
Organisations based in Dhaka
British Council